Motion JPEG 2000 (MJ2 or MJP2) is a file format for motion sequences of JPEG 2000 images and associated audio, based on the MP4 and QuickTime format. Filename extensions for Motion JPEG 2000 video files are .mj2 and .mjp2, as defined in RFC 3745.

ISO Standards 

MJ2, first defined by Part 3 of the ISO Standard for JPEG 2000 ISO/IEC 15444 in November 2001 (ISO/IEC 15444-3:2002) as a standalone document, has later been defined by ISO/IEC 15444-3:2007, ISO/IEC 15444-3:2007/Amd 1:2010, additional profiles for archiving applications, and by ISO/IEC 15444-12 which defines the JPEG 2000 base media format, which contains the timing, structure, and media information for timed sequences of media data.

The standard is available for download from ITU-T as their Recommendation T.802.

MPEG vs MJ2 
Motion JPEG2000 was always intended to coexist with MPEG. Unlike MPEG, MJ2 does not implement inter-frame coding; each frame is coded independently using JPEG 2000. This makes MJ2 more resilient to propagation of errors over time, more scalable, and better suited to networked and point-to-point environments, with additional advantages over MPEG with respect to random frame access, but at the expense of increased storage and bandwidth requirements.

History 
From 1997 to 2000, the JPEG 2000 image compression standard was developed by a Joint Photographic Experts Group (JPEG) committee chaired by Swiss-Iranian engineer Touradj Ebrahimi (later the JPEG president). In contrast to the original 1992 JPEG standard, which is a discrete cosine transform (DCT) based lossy compression format for static digital images, JPEG 2000 is a discrete wavelet transform (DWT) based compression standard that could be adapted for motion imaging video compression with the Motion JPEG 2000 extension. JPEG 2000 technology was later selected as the video coding standard for digital cinema in 2004.

See also 
 Motion JPEG

References 
 digitalpreservation.gov Motion JPEG 2000 File Format Sustainability of Digital Formats - Planning for Library of Congress Collections

External links 
 JPEG 2000 Official website, part 3 Motion JPEG 2000.
 Digital cinema reels from motion JPEG2000 advances
 OpenJPEG homepage open-source JPEG 2000 codec written in C, developed to promote the use of JPEG 2000.
 GitHub page for OpenJPEG
 Documentation for the Openjpeg Motion JPEG 2000 utilities.

Motion-JPEG 2000
Graphics file formats
ISO/IEC standards
ITU-T recommendations
Iranian inventions
Swiss inventions